The giant tapir (Tapirus augustus) is an extinct species of tapir that lived in southern China, Vietnam and Laos, with reports suggesting it also lived in Taiwan, Java, and potentially Borneo. The species has been recorded from Middle and Late Pleistocene. There is only weak evidence for a Holocene survival. The species was also placed in its own genus of Megatapirus, however, it is now conventionally placed within Tapirus.

Discovery and taxonomy 
Despite not being named until 1923, the Palaeontological Museum, Munich Paleontologist Max Schlosser described several teeth purchased from Chinese drug stores in 1903 that he assigned to Tapirus sinensis. Some of the teeth had been unearthed at the Chang I locality in Wanzhou, Eastern Sichuan, China that come from the Pleistocene strata of the area. Tapirus augustus was first described in 1923 William Diller Matthew and Walter Granger based on fossils found by the American Museum of Natural History during the Central Asiatic Expeditions of 1920–1930. The fossils had been recovered just a few miles from the site where many of the teeth described by Schlosser had been found.

References

Prehistoric tapirs
Pleistocene odd-toed ungulates
Holocene extinctions
Pleistocene mammals of Asia
Fossil taxa described in 1923